Eminence Hill is an American Western film written and directed by Robert Conway. It stars Barry Corbin, Dominique Swain, Lance Henriksen, Clint James, Owen Conway, Dustin James Leighton and Anna Harr.

Plot 
In search of revenge against the twelve jurors who sentenced his brother to death, Royce Tullis (Clint James) left a trail of bloody revenge against them.

Cast 
 Barry Corbin as Noah
 Dominique Swain as Gretchen
 Lance Henriksen as Mason
 Clint James as Royce
 Owen Conway as Quincy
 Anna Harr as Ruth
 Brinke Stevens as Wilhelmina
 Dustin James Leighton as Dathan

References

External links 
 

2019 films
2019 Western (genre) films
American Western (genre) films
2010s English-language films
Films directed by Robert Conway
2010s American films